BIAB may refer to:
Band-in-a-Box, a  software package
Beijing International Art Biennale
Brewing in a bag, a type of homebrewing
Boys in a Band, a band
British and Irish Archaeological Bibliography

See also 
 Bīāb